Lord William Manners (13 November 1697 – 23 April 1772), of Croxton Park, Leicestershire was an English nobleman and Whig politician who sat in the House of Commons between 1719 and 1754. He was also was the second son of John Manners, 2nd Duke of Rutland and his first wife, Catherine Russell. His brothers John, Robert and Sherard were also Members of Parliament.

Career

Parliament
Manners was elected Member of Parliament for Leicestershire at a contested by-election on 7 December 1719. He was returned again unopposed for Leicestershire in the 1722 general election. In about 1722, he was appointed Gentleman of the Bedchamber to Prince of Wales. He became Lord of the Bedchamber to the King on the succession of George II in 1727 and was returned unopposed at the 1727 general election. He voted with the Administration on every recorded occasion. He did not stand in 1734 to the disappointment of his friends. He resigned his office at Court in 1738 and was returned to Parliament as MP for Newark by his brother John, now 3rd Duke of Rutland, at a by-election on 31 January 1738. He followed his brother into opposition, voting against the Spanish convention in 1739 and the place bill in 1740, but supporting the government on the motion for the dismissal of Walpole in February 1741. He was returned again for Newark at the  1741 general election. His brother-in-law, Henry Pelham, offered him a post on the Treasury board in 1743, but he refused it. At the 1747 general election he was returned again for Newark. He was listed as an opposition supporter and took sides with Fredeick, Prince of Wales. He stood down at the 1754 general election, in favour of his son John.

Gambling

Manners was known as a successful gambler and  made a considerable private fortune by gaming. He is said to have won 1,200 guineas in an evening at New Year 1728. He is supposed to be portrayed in the gambling scene of Hogarth's  ‘The Rake’s Progress’. He also kept large  racing studs and looked after the Belvoir foxhounds. He died on 23 April 1772 as the result of a riding accident.

Family and Children
Manners never married, but by his mistress Corbetta Smyth, daughter of William Smyth, Apothecary of Shrewsbury, he had ten children:
Corbetta Manners (1728–before 1753), eloped to marry Capt. George Lawson Hall; their daughter Corbetta Hall was a chief beneficiary of her grandmother's will.
John Manners (1730 – 23 September 1792) politician, married Louisa Tollemache, 7th Countess of Dysart and had issue, several children.
Rev. Thomas Manners (1731 – 1 December 1812), twice married; firstly in 1758 to Susannah Buckland, who suffered from a mental condition, and secondly immediately after her death. His son William Manners married Frances Whichcote  of Aswarby, and has descendants.
William Manners (1734–1827), married Caroline Pickering
Russell Manners (1736–1800), married Mary Rayner
Augusta Manners (21 November 1737–1828)
Frances Manners (1739–1817)
Robert Manners (b. 1740), died young
Caroline Manners (1741–1800), married Jeremiah Ellis
Robert Manners (2 May 1743 – 18 April 1810), married Elizabeth White (1749–1817)With numerous descendants including Rear Admiral Sir Errol Manners (1883-1953).

His descendant David Drew-Smythe speculates that Lord William Manners and his mistress Corbetta Smyth, who had a long-term relationship, never married because of inheritance clauses.  All Corbetta's children were recognized by their father.
Conditions of inheritance being linked to stipulations about specific marriage expectations or restrictions are not uncommon and have been known to "force" couples into living and bringing up their children in 'unmarried' relationships in order to avoid losing an inheritance. This is speculation, of course, but there must have been some specific reason why they chose to be unmarried.

Notes

External links
Manners genealogy
David Drew-Smythe. Corbetta Smyth's will

1697 births
1772 deaths
Younger sons of dukes
W
Members of the Parliament of Great Britain for Leicestershire
British MPs 1715–1722
British MPs 1722–1727
British MPs 1727–1734
British MPs 1734–1741
British MPs 1741–1747
British MPs 1747–1754